Rui Alberto Martins Golias Drumond de Sousa (born 1980), also known as Rui Drumond, is a Portuguese singer.

Career 
Drumond participated in the Eurovision Song Contest 2005, representing Portugal along with Luciana Abreu, forming the duo "2B". They finished 17th in the semi-final, failing to qualify. In 2014, he won season 2 of The Voice Portugal. In 2017, he participated in Festival da Canção and attempted to qualify for Eurovision Song Contest for the second time, with his single "O Teu Melhor", only to be eliminated in the semi-finals.

Discography

Studio albums

Singles

References 

Portuguese singer-songwriters
The Voice (franchise) winners
1980 births
Eurovision Song Contest entrants of 2005
Eurovision Song Contest entrants for Portugal
Living people
21st-century Portuguese male singers
People from Torres Vedras